2015–16 Vijay Hazare Trophy is the 14th season of the Vijay Hazare Trophy, a List A cricket tournament in India. It is contested by 27 domestic cricket teams of India divided into 4 Groups. The winner will advance to play 2015–16 Deodhar Trophy.
The top two teams advanced to the quarter finals.

Points Table

Fixtures

Round one
Ravichandran Ashwin-led Tamil Nadu opened their account in the one-day tournament with a thumping win over Assam. The off-spinner claimed three wickets for 31 runs as they bowled Assam out for 210 with two balls to spare. Abhinav Mukund then anchored the innings to help the team attain the target with ease. The opener was out for 104 with just two runs needed for victory.

Mumbai's debutants shone in the victory as they cantered to a comfortable win. Pacer Sagar Trivedi claimed three for 21 as Punjab posted 254 on the board. Yuvraj scored a run-a-ball 93 to take the team to a respectable total after Dhawal Kulkarni and Trivedi claimed the top-order. Debutant Jay Bista then led the chase with an 87-ball 92 while Abhishek Nayar took Mumbai across the line with an unbeaten 44.

Services set Rajasthan a 231-run target after being asked to bat in Secunderabad. While NB Singh claimed a four-for, Yashpal Singh 75 not out and Suraj Yadav's unbeaten 44 lower down the order. Rajat Paliwal then claimed two for 10 including the wicket of Dishant Yagnik after while Suraj and Diwesh Pathania too picked two wickets apiece to bowl Rajasthan out for a paltry 167 and claim victory.

Round two
Experienced campaigner, Rajat Bhatia's heroics with the ball and the bat helped Rajasthan to victory in a thrilling encounter. The all-rounder, claimed five for 17 to bowl the opposition out for 148 and then took Rajasthan across the line with an unbeaten 82-ball 68 in a low-scoring game. While wickets fell at regular intervals at the other end, he helped pull off a win in Hyderabad.

Defending 238 runs Siddharth Kaul claimed five for 32 while Barinder Sran took three for 36 to keep Punjab in a commanding position. While the rest of the Hyderabad lineup crumbled, Sumnath Kolla scored 63 before retiring hurt. Hyderabad were 182 for nine when they conceded the match to Punjab.

Earlier, Punjab were helped to 238 by Mayank Siddana (64) after they were left on 75 for three. Yuvraj Singh chipped in with 36 runs while Gurkeerat Mann and Gitansh Khera contributed 35 and 30 respectively.

Tamil Nadu's middle-order helped the team post a stiff 313-run target for Mumbai in the second round match. The twins - Aparajith and Indrajith scored 77 and 60* respectively while Murali Vijay (55) and R Satish too scored half-centuries in the effort.

Akhil Herwadkar then got Mumbai off to a good start with a whirlwind 86-ball 107 but the rest of the lineup fumbled after his departure with the score on 141 in 22.2 overs. While Siddhesh Lad toiled to keep the innings afloat, the TN bowlers struck at the other end to push Mumbai further on the back-foot. He was the last to return to the pavilion for 47.

After skipper R Ashwin gave TN their first breakthrough, leg-spinner M Ashwin claimed three wickets including that of Herwadkar while Rahil Shah and M Mohammed claimed two wickets apiece.

Round three

Round four

Round five

Round six

Round seven

References

Indian domestic cricket competitions
Domestic cricket competitions in 2015–16